Yannick Morin (born 4 July 1975) is a Canadian bobsledder. He competed in the two man event at the 2002 Winter Olympics.

References

External links
 

1975 births
Living people
Canadian male bobsledders
Olympic bobsledders of Canada
Bobsledders at the 2002 Winter Olympics
Sportspeople from Montreal